Yury Mukhin is the name of:

Yury Mukhin (author) (born 1949), Russian conspiracy theorist
Yury Mukhin (swimmer) (born 1971), Russian freestyle swimmer